Conner O'Malley (born December 20, 1986) is an American comedian, writer and actor. For his work on Late Night with Seth Meyers, he received three Writers Guild of America Awards nominations. He also produces videos on YouTube and was active on the now defunct social media platform Vine. O'Malley has also appeared on Broad City and Joe Pera Talks with You. He is married to actress and fellow comedian Aidy Bryant.

Career
O'Malley began his comedy career at the Annoyance Theatre, where he met his future wife, Aidy Bryant. When Aidy was cast on SNL, the couple moved to New York, and O'Malley began uploading short comedy videos to the social media platform Vine, while working a day job as a dog walker. O'Malley's videos quickly began to gain attention and acclaim, and in 2014, he was hired as a writer for Late Night with Seth Meyers. While writing for Late Night, O'Malley also occasionally performed on the show, creating several re-occurring characters, such as "Anniversary Guy", "Stink Mouth PigMan", and "Gørbøn Hausinfrud".

In addition to writing for Late Night, O'Malley has also written for Joe Pera Talks with You, which he also co-starred in as Joe's neighbor Mike Melsky, and the 66th Primetime Emmy Awards. As an actor, O'Malley has been featured in several television shows, most notably Detroiters, where he played Trevor, Tim's free-wheeling brother, and Horace and Pete, where he played Eric, the boyfriend of Horace's daughter, played by Bryant. O'Malley has also appeared on Broad City, and Netflix's The Characters, and has been a recurring guest on The Chris Gethard Show since 2013. In 2019, he appeared on I Think You Should Leave with Tim Robinson and he appeared in 2021 on HBO's That Damn Michael Che.

Since 2016, O'Malley has also frequently posted videos on his YouTube channel, similar to his Vine work.

Style of comedy
O'Malley's videos have shown him playing a manic and aggressive persona with loose thoughts. His Vines, uploaded until the site was defunct, showed him confronting drivers on the street and talking to them in non-sequiturs, and his Twitter videos have included a series of increasingly chaotic and demanding vlogs directed toward presidential candidates Howard Schultz and Beto O'Rourke that have been compared to performance art. 

Shane Ryan, writing for Paste, said O'Malley's comedy expresses "anger and envy and a sort of perverted worship of wealth and the American dream". O'Malley has also published comedy videos on YouTube that have satirized InfoWars, South by Southwest and the AVN Awards. Chloe Lizotte, writing for Reverse Shot, compared O'Malley's work to Adam Curtis and said that his videos "mock the idea that commercial entertainment could stand in for political action or fill a spiritual void."

Filmography

Film

Television

Award shows

References

External links

1986 births 
Living people
21st-century American comedians
21st-century American male actors
21st-century American male writers
American comedy writers
American male comedians
American male film actors
American male television actors
American male television writers
American sketch comedians
American stand-up comedians
American YouTubers
Late Night with Seth Meyers
People from Chicago
Vine (service) celebrities
Writers from Chicago